Parupalli Kashyap (born 8 September 1986) is an Indian badminton player. A former World No.6, he trains at Gopichand Badminton Academy. He was awarded the Arjuna Award by the Government of India in 2012.

He created history by reaching the quarter-finals of men's singles at the 2012 London Olympics, being the first male player from India to do so. At the 2014 Glasgow Commonwealth Games, he won the gold medal in men's singles. Kashyap was the Icon Player for the Indian Badminton League team, Banga Beats in the 2013 edition.

He married fellow badminton player, Saina Nehwal in a private ceremony on 14 December 2018.

Early life (1997–2004) 
Born to Uday Shankar and Subhadra of Guntur, as an 11-year-old, Kashyap Parupalli first enrolled with a training camp conducted by S. M. Arif in Hyderabad, India. Because his father had a transferable job, their family kept moving frequently. While in Bangalore, he joined the Padukone Academy. In 2004, they moved back to Hyderabad. Soon after, Kashyap was diagnosed with asthma after a few medical tests. Kashyap felt that his stay in Bangalore during 2000–03 might have aggravated the condition. Though the diagnosis came as a shock to him and he thought that his playing career was finished, he put in a lot of effort with determination to overcome the problem. Using appropriate medication, his condition began to improve dramatically. He continued his training at the Gopichand Academy under Pullela Gopichand, a former All England Open champion.

Professional career

2005–2009 
In 2005, Kashyap represented Andhra Pradesh and won the a boys' singles title at the National Junior Open Badminton Championships. From 2006 onwards, he started to appear at international tournaments. In that year's Hong Kong Open, he caused an upset by defeating the then world number 19 Przemysław Wacha in the pre-quarterfinals; he lost the next round though. A few months later, he defeated Wacha again at the Bitburger Open to reach the semifinals. In 2006, his world ranking improved from outside the 100 to 64. Coach Gopichand was happy at the win and felt that it was a good sign that Kashyap was winning his important matches against higher-ranked players. In the same year, Kashyap was chosen to represent India at the 2006 Asian Games. At the 33rd National Games, Kashyap defeated the then National champion Chetan Anand to win a gold medal for Andhra Pradesh. Between 2006–07, Kashyap won a few national tournaments as well.

In 2009, Kashyap was a semifinalist at the Dutch Open and the 2009 Senior National Badminton Championships. In the same year, he was the runners-up at the Thailand International, Spanish Open and Toulouse Open. At the 2009 Singapore Super Series, Kashyap was the semifinalist.

2010 Commonwealth Games 
At the 2010 Commonwealth Games, he reached the semifinals stage but lost to Rajiv Ouseph of England. He won the bronze medal against chetan Anand. He also played a crucial role in India winning a silver medal in the Team Event of 2010 Commonwealth Games

He also reached the semi-finals at the 2010 Indian Open Grand Prix Gold where he lost out to compatriot Gurusai Datt. He lost out to Arvind Bhat in the finals of the 75th Senior National Badminton Championship held at Rohtak in 2011.

Kashyap reached the semifinal stage of 2012 Djaram Indonesia Open in the men's singles competition, where he eventually lost. En route to the semifinals, he upset world number 3 Chen Long and world number 16 Hans-Kristian Vittinghus.

2012 Summer Olympics 

At the 2012 Summer Olympics, Kashyap surprised one and all by winning all his matches at the group stage, which involved the shocking defeat of Nguyễn Tiến Minh. In the Pre-quarters he defeated Niluka Karunaratne of Sri Lanka by 21–16, 15–21, 21–14. In the Quarterfinals, it was disappointment as a dejected looking Kashyap was escorted out of the court after his loss to top seed Lee Chong Wei in straight sets. In the process, he created history by becoming the only Indian to reach the Quarterfinal stages in the Olympics in Men's Singles. This achievement led him to 19th rank.

Later his victory in the Indian Open Grand Prix Gold 2012 led him to a career best ranking of 14. His success in Korea in 2013 led his rank up to 10.On 31 January 2013 he achieved a ranking of 9.
He reached the quarterfinals in the Swiss open which led him to a ranking of 7 as per the rankings provided by BWF on 14 March.
He moved up to a career best ranking of 6 after his first round match against Taufik Hidayat of Indonesia.

2014 
Recovering from a couple of "freak injuries", Kashyap started the year winning the first round match against Germany's Marc Zwiebler in Malaysia Open but he lost in the very next round to the number 3 seed Jan O Jorgensen. In the Indian Open Grand Prix gold Tournament also his performance was not very satisfactory as the defending champion lost in the quarterfinals to Zulfadli Zulkiffli. Kashyap's ranking was declining steadily until he reached the Semifinal stages of the 2014 Swiss Open Grand Prix Gold.

One of the biggest victories for Kashyap came in the 2014 India Super Series when he beat the Chinese world number 6 Wang Zhengming, 12–21 21–17 12–21. He extended Indian hopes till the Quarterfinals where he lost out to top seed Lee Chong Wei. The 2014 Commonwealth Games was a halt to a steady decline in form for Kashyap as he lost almost all the subsequent matches after his home tournament. But there was more disappointment waiting for Kashyap as he lost in the very first round of 2014 BWF World Championships to Dieter Domke. Even in Asian Games 2014 he was a huge disappointment as he lost in the second round. He was widely criticized for not showing good fighting spirit in his second round match against top seed Lee Chong Wei which was quite uncharacteristic of Kashyap.

Despite all these disappointing losses, Kashyap managed to return to form in the 2014 Denmark Super Series Premier where he reached the semifinal stages. En route to the Semifinals, he upset world number 3 Jan Ø. Jørgensen his second win against the Dane. In the very next tournament that he played, he beat world number 4, Kenichi Tago and world number 9, Tian Houwei in consecutive rounds thus reaching the quarterfinals of 2014 French Super Series. He continued his great form in the 2014 China Open Super Series Premier where he reached the Quarterfinal stages. Back to back quarterfinal appearances in Superseries Events helped Kashyap to jump up in the Destination Dubai rankings, but unfortunately another first round loss in the 2014 Hong Kong Super Series saw Kashyap drop from 11 in the Destination Dubai ranking to 14.

2014 Commonwealth Games 
Kashyap was seeded second at the 2014 Commonwealth Games. As expected Kashyap crashed into the Men's Singles finals. His route to the final was not easy. In the Semifinal match against Rajiv Ouseph of England, he played out of his skin to avenge his loss in the 2010 Commonwealth Games semifinal and also in the mixed team event, where India eventually finished in the fourth position. In the finals, in intense three games he defeated Derek Wong of Singapore 21–14, 11–21, 21–19 and thus won a historic gold medal for India. The gold medal in men's singles came after a long wait of 32 years, allowing Kashyap to see his name written amongst two legends of Indian Badminton who were also former gold medalists in the same event, Prakash Padukone in 1978, followed by Syed Modi in 1982.

2015 
Despite promising nothing lesser than a podium finish, Kashyap started the year on a disappointing note, losing out to Derek Wong in the pre-quarters of 2015 Malaysia Open Grand Prix Gold. But it was a completely different story at the India Open Grand Prix Gold 2015 where Kashyap defeated compatriot Srikanth Kidambi 23–21, 23–21 in an intense final. However, the real challenge of the tournament was from Viktor Axelsen in the semi-finals, where Kashyap was made to sweat before Axelsen ran out of steam and surrendered the match 18–21, 22–20, 21–7 to Kashyap.
Kashyap's woes continued in the Superseries events as he lost out in the first round of the 2015 All England Super Series Premier. In his home Superseries event too Kashyap failed to reach the quarterfinals, bowing out to Xue Song of China in straight games in the pre-quarters.

2016 
Kashyap failed to qualify for the 2016 Summer Olympics in Rio.

2018 
Kashyap failed to get a spot in the team for 2018 Asian Games and Commonwealth Games.

2020–Present 
Kashyap failed to qualify for the 2020 Olympics, thus missing out on qualifying for 2 consecutive Olympics. He was not selected in the team for the 2021 Sudirman Cup and the 2021 Thomas Cup. He retired 0-3 down to Chou Tien-chen in the 1st round of the 2021 Denmark Open. His run of 1st round exits continued with 1st round exits in the 2021 French Open (badminton), the 2021 Indonesia Masters (losing to Hans-Kristian Vittinghus 10-21, 19-21) and the 2021 Indonesia Open (losing to Loh Kean Yew 11-21, 14-21).

Achievements

Commonwealth Games
Men's singles

BWF World Tour (1 runner-up) 
The BWF World Tour, which was announced on 19 March 2017 and implemented in 2018, is a series of elite badminton tournaments sanctioned by the Badminton World Federation (BWF). The BWF World Tour is divided into levels of World Tour Finals, Super 1000, Super 750, Super 500, Super 300, and the BWF Tour Super 100.

Men's singles

BWF Grand Prix (2 titles, 1 runner-up) 
The BWF Grand Prix had two levels, the Grand Prix and Grand Prix Gold. It was a series of badminton tournaments sanctioned by the Badminton World Federation (BWF) and played between 2007 and 2017.

Men's singles

 BWF Grand Prix Gold tournament
 BWF Grand Prix tournament

BWF International Challenge/Series (1 title, 3 runners-up) 
Men's singles

 BWF International Challenge tournament
 BWF International Series tournament

Performance in Super Series events

Awards, rewards and recognition 
 Arjuna Award, 2012

 For the gold medal at 2014 Commonwealth Games
  cash award by Badminton Association of India.
  cash award by Telangana government.

Record against selected opponents 
Record against year-end Finals finalists, World Championships semi finalists, and Olympic quarter finalists. Accurate as of 29 November 2022.

References

External links 

 
 Parupalli Kashyap at Olympic Gold Quest
 Olympics London 2012

1986 births
Living people
Racket sportspeople from Hyderabad, India
Racket sportspeople from Guntur
Telugu people
Indian male badminton players
Badminton players at the 2012 Summer Olympics
Olympic badminton players of India
Badminton players at the 2006 Asian Games
Badminton players at the 2010 Asian Games
Badminton players at the 2014 Asian Games
Asian Games competitors for India
Badminton players at the 2010 Commonwealth Games
Badminton players at the 2014 Commonwealth Games
Commonwealth Games gold medallists for India
Commonwealth Games silver medallists for India
Commonwealth Games bronze medallists for India
Commonwealth Games medallists in badminton
Recipients of the Arjuna Award
Medallists at the 2010 Commonwealth Games